Tandarai is a Panchayat town in Tiruvanamalai district, Tamil Nadu India. It is the fourth largest town in Kilpennathur taluk and has one railway station. It lies between Vettavalam and Veraiyur and has a population of 5201 and altitude of 81m.

Cities and towns in Tiruvannamalai district